Just Call Me Lonesome is a studio album by Slim Whitman, released in 1961 on Imperial Records.

Track listing 
The album was issued in the United States by Imperial as a 12-inch long-playing record, catalog numbers LP-9137 (mono) and LP-12137 (stereo).

There is also a U.S. reissue under the title Portrait.

References 

1961 albums
Slim Whitman albums
Imperial Records albums